EIAC may stand for:

 Eastern Indiana Athletic Conference, an interscholastic athletic conference in the Indiana High School Athletic Association (IHSAA)
 Eastern Intercollegiate Athletic Conference, a defunct intercollegiate athletic conference in the National Association of Intercollegiate Athletics (NAIA)